Benedito Roberto (5 November 1946 in Mussende – 8 November 2020 in Malanje) was an Angolan Roman Catholic archbishop.

Roberto was born in Angola and was ordained to the priesthood in 1981. He served as bishop of the Roman Catholic Diocese of Novo Redondo, Angola, from 1995 to 2006. The diocese was renamed  the Roman Catholic Diocese of Sumbe in 2006 and Roberto continued to serve as bishop of the diocese. Roberto then served as archbishop of the Roman Catholic Archdiocese of Malanje, Angola, from 2012 until his death.

Notes

1946 births
2020 deaths
Deaths from the COVID-19 pandemic in Angola
20th-century Roman Catholic bishops in Angola
21st-century Roman Catholic archbishops in Angola
Roman Catholic bishops of Sumbe
Roman Catholic archbishops of Malanje